Morgan Fairchild (born Patsy Ann McClenny; February 3, 1950) is an American actress. She began acting in the early 1970s and has had roles in several television series since.

Fairchild began her career on the CBS daytime soap opera Search for Tomorrow as Jennifer Pace from 1973 to 1977. In 1978, she appeared on the primetime soap opera Dallas as the first actress to portray Jenna Wade, before taking a lead role on the NBC series Flamingo Road in 1980 (for which she was nominated for a Golden Globe Award for Best Actress – Television Series Drama). In 1984, she co-starred on ABC's short-lived television drama Paper Dolls, and then appeared on Falcon Crest as attorney Jordan Roberts from 1985 to 1986. Fairchild has also performed in theater and played guest roles on television comedies, including Murphy Brown (for which she was nominated for a Primetime Emmy Award for Outstanding Guest Actress in a Comedy Series), Two and a Half Men, Roseanne, Cybill and Friends. She is a board member of SAG-AFTRA.

Early life
Fairchild was born Patsy Ann McClenny in Dallas, Texas, the daughter of Martha Jane (Hartt), a high school English teacher who taught at Richardson High School (in Richardson, Texas), and Edward Milton McClenny. Fairchild has a younger sister, Cathryn Hartt, who is also an actress. As a younger child, she was seen on WFAA's Mr. Peppermint Show with host Jerry Haynes. In her teens she was in the audience on WFAA's Sump'n Else bandstand show. She auditioned three times to be in The Little Group, which was the show's dance group. Also during this time, she appeared in several locally broadcast commercials on Dallas-Fort Worth television stations.

Career

Fairchild's first acting job was as a double for Faye Dunaway during filming for the film Bonnie and Clyde (1967), particularly in scenes where Bonnie is driving a car, because Dunaway could not drive a stick shift. She took her new first name, Morgan, from the David Warner film Morgan - A Suitable Case for Treatment (1966). Fairchild then moved to New York City, where she secured her first credited onscreen role as the maniacal Jennifer Pace in the daytime soap opera Search for Tomorrow from 1973 until 1977. From the mid-1970s, she began to make various appearances on episodic primetime television series such as Kojak, Happy Days, Police Woman, The Bob Newhart Show, and a few episodes of CBS Radio Mystery Theater.

Fairchild played Jenna Wade in the soap opera Dallas for one episode in 1978. The same year, Fairchild made the television film The Initiation of Sarah and also had a recurring role on the sitcom Mork & Mindy. In 1980, she scored her first regular primetime role as Constance Weldon Carlyle on the soap opera Flamingo Road. Though the series had an impressive beginning, the ratings soon dropped and it was cancelled after two seasons. Fairchild was nominated for a Golden Globe Award for her role.

After the cancellation of Flamingo Road, Fairchild continued to make guest appearances in a variety of episodic television series such as Hotel, Simon & Simon, Magnum, P.I. and The Love Boat. She also starred in the theatrical film The Seduction (1982). In 1984, along with Joan Collins, she co-hosted the ABC-TV special Blondes vs. Brunettes, a one-hour variety show that gently poked fun at popular culture's blonde vs. brunette rivalry. In that same year, she also co-starred in another primetime soap opera Paper Dolls playing modelling agency owner Racine. The series was cancelled halfway through its first season, but by this time, Fairchild was established as a television actress. In 1985, she joined the cast of the soap opera Falcon Crest, playing the glamorous lawyer Jordan Roberts for a season. She also appeared in the miniseries North and South (1985), and its sequel (1986).

In 1985, Jon Lovitz on Saturday Night Live created the "Tommy Flanagan, The Pathological Liar" character who claimed outlandish achievements for himself, culminating in the grand illusion that his wife was Morgan Fairchild. The obvious remoteness of such a possibility, and its mainstream comic appeal, was testimonial to Fairchild's broad popularity and desirability.

Fairchild continued to make appearances in films and television series throughout the 1980s, and garnered an Emmy Award nomination for her guest appearance in a 1989 episode of Murphy Brown. In the early 1990s, she was cast in a recurring role in Roseanne, as Sandra Bernhard's bisexual girlfriend Marla. In 1994, Fairchild appeared in an unexpectedly campy advertisement campaign for clothing retailer Old Navy, with Joan Collins and other formerly familiar faces on television. Her reprised role as the over-the-top glamour vixen was so successful that the company created numerous sequels around her persona. She played herself in the comedy films Naked Gun 33 1/3: The Final Insult (1994), Holy Man (1998) and Walk Hard: The Dewey Cox Story (2007).

In 1995, Fairchild returned to daytime soap operas as the catty Sydney Chase on The City. She played the role for a year, after which she went on to appear in General Hospital. She also made guest appearances on the hit sitcom Friends (as Chandler Bing's mother, Nora) and was a recurring guest star on the sitcom Cybill as Andrea, a rival of Cybill Shepherd's character.

Through the years, Fairchild has also appeared in various theater productions. More recently, she starred in the role of Mrs. Robinson in the stage adaptation of the film The Graduate. She also fronted an international advertising campaign for the consumer tooth whitening product Dental White. In 2005, Fairchild appeared in the competition reality show But Can They Sing? on VH1.

In 2006, she was cast in yet another of her "rich bitch" roles in the MyNetworkTV series Fashion House, playing Sophia Blakely, a rival to Bo Derek's character, Maria Gianni. She has also appeared on the television series Chuck as Dr. Honey Woodcomb, the mother of Captain Awesome. In 2007 she appeared on Two and a Half Men where she was cast as a cougar who propositions Charlie Harper with the line "What has multiple orgasms and hums?"  She made another return to soap operas in 2009 when she had a guest role in the daytime series The Bold and the Beautiful. In recent years, she guest-starred in Bones, Revenge and Hot in Cleveland.

In 2014, Fairchild was named spokesperson for a website created to help consumers make burial preplanning choices. In that capacity, she appeared on television commercials and in a direct mail campaign.

Fairchild has appeared in a number of independent movies in 2000s and 2010s. In 2017, she returned to daytime for a limited run in Days of Our Lives playing Anjelica Deveraux, a role previously played by soap actress Judith Chapman. Fairchild received Daytime Emmy Award for Outstanding Guest Performer in a Drama Series nomination for her performance. In 2022, she guest-starred in the two episodes of ABC soap opera General Hospital playing Haven de Havilland.

Personal life

Fairchild was married to Jack Calmes from 1967 to 1973. 

For many years, she has been an activist for social causes including AIDS and environmentalism. 

Since 1980, she has been involved with long-term partner Mark Seiler. 

She stated that she was twice kidnapped in the early 1970s.

In addition to her work as an actress, Fairchild has long maintained a strong role within the Screen Actors Guild, now SAG-AFTRA. Fairchild was a three-year board member of the Guild and has served on several committees, including co-chair Legislative Committee, National Executive Committee, SAG-AFTRA Relations Committee, Commercials Contracts Committee, Honors and Tributes Committee (HATS), and Guild Governance and Rules Committee.

Filmography

Film

Television

Video games

References

External links

 Official website
 
 
 
 Morgan Fairchild interview

1950 births
Actresses from Texas
American film actresses
American soap opera actresses
American television actresses
American voice actresses
Living people
People from Dallas
Texas Democrats
20th-century American actresses
20th-century American women
21st-century American actresses
21st-century American women
California Democrats